Joseph "Joe" Rooney (born 1 October 1963) is an Irish actor, comedian and singer-songwriter from Drogheda, County Louth.

He is arguably best known for his acting and in particular for playing Father Damo in the Channel 4 sitcom Father Ted, appearing in the episode "The Old Grey Whistle Theft" and a cameo in "Flight into Terror". Rooney had a starring role as Timmy Higgins in the RTÉ television comedy Killinaskully, which ran for five series. Joe also wrote on the fourth and fifth series of Killinaskully. He currently hosts the podcast PodaRooney, on which he interviews guests who are mostly involved in the entertainment industry. Joe has performed stand-up worldwide, including New York, Los Angeles, San Francisco, Chicago, Pittsburgh, Toronto, Shanghai, Beijing, Hong Kong, Barcelona, Brussels, Moscow, Muscat (Oman), Manama (Bahrain) and Dubai. He has also performed at Irish festivals in Kansas City (Missouri), Milwaukee and La Crosse (Wisconsin).

Joe presented a children's summer weekday afternoon series called Jump Around for RTÉ, which aired as a stand in for The Den when it was rested during the summer. The series ran from 12 June to 1 September 1995 and included games, competitions, quizzes and television series and cartoons such as Widget the World Watcher, The Brady Bunch, Ocean Girl, Batman: The Animated Series and Teenage Mutant Hero Turtles.

In more recent years Joe has had featured roles in TV3's Red Rock, CBBC's Roy and the feature films "Monged" and "South". He has a starring role in the feature film Wretch (2018) shot in Kansas City by first time writer/director Mathew Dunehoo. He starred alongside Moe Dunford in the short film Stephanie (2018) directed by Fergal Costello. He also has been involved in the podcasting world with "Podarooney" and "Talking Ted", a Father Ted podcast from the HeadStuff Podcast Network. 

Other acting roles include Fergus Scully, a roving reporter who speaks in pidgin English and Irish, on the TG4 sketch show Rí Rá. In 1997, he appeared with Paul Tylak in Messrs Tylak and Rooney, a twelve-episode TV3 comedy travel series.

References

External links

1963 births
Living people
Irish male comedians
Irish stand-up comedians
Irish male television actors
People from Tuam
Actors from County Galway
Irish comedy musicians